The White Fortress is a 2021 Bosnian-Canadian coming-of-age drama film written and directed by Igor Drljaca.

The film premiered on March 1, 2021 at the 71st Berlin International Film Festival. Produced by Canada's Timelapse Pictures and Bosnia-Herzegovina's SCCA/pro.baIt, it had its Canadian premiere at the 2021 Vancouver International Film Festival. It was selected as the Bosnian entry for the Best International Feature Film at the 94th Academy Awards.

Plot
Faruk (Pavle Čemerikić), a teenage orphan living with his grandmother in the suburbs of Sarajevo, is drawn into a romance with Mona (Sumeja Dardagan), a member of a wealthy, politically powerful family.

The film's cast also includes Izudin Bajrović, Ermin Bravo, Hasija Borić, Kerim Čutuna and Jasmin Geljo.

Awards
The film was named to the Toronto International Film Festival's annual year-end Canada's Top Ten list for 2021.

See also
List of submissions to the 94th Academy Awards for Best International Feature Film
List of Bosnian submissions for the Academy Award for Best International Feature Film

References

External links

2021 films
2021 drama films
Bosnian-language films
English-language Bosnian films
Bosnia and Herzegovina drama films
English-language Canadian films
Canadian coming-of-age drama films
Films directed by Igor Drljaca
2020s Canadian films